Warren Michael Manzi  (July 1, 1955 – February 11, 2016) was an American playwright and actor, who was best known for the play Perfect Crime.

Career
Manzi was born in Manchester, New Hampshire to a single mother of Italian descent. His family later moved to Lawrence, Massachusetts, where he attended Holy Rosary School and Central Catholic High School. He graduated from the College of the Holy Cross and obtained a master's degree from the Yale School of Drama. Manzi wrote Perfect Crime in 1980 at age 25, while an understudy for a role in Amadeus. Early reviews of Perfect Crime described it as confusing, and Manzi continually rewrote the play throughout the rest of his life. Perfect Crime opened in New York City on April 18, 1987 and was performed over 11,800 times throughout Manzi's lifetime, becoming the longest running play in city theatre history. Manzi also wrote One for the Money and The Queen of the Parting Shot.

As an actor, Manzi appeared in the films The Manhattan Project (1986) and Nuts (1987).

He was married to Ellen Margaret Michelin from 1995 to 1996, when she died. Manzi died of pneumonia aged 60 in 2016, in Lawrence, Massachusetts.

References

External links

1955 births
2016 deaths
20th-century American dramatists and playwrights
Writers from Manchester, New Hampshire
College of the Holy Cross alumni
Yale School of Drama alumni
20th-century American male actors
American male film actors
Deaths from pneumonia in Massachusetts
American writers of Italian descent
People from Lawrence, Massachusetts
Actors from Manchester, New Hampshire